Oleksandr Chyzhov (born 10 August 1986, in Poltava, Ukrainian SSR) is a retired Ukrainian football defender.

Career statistics

Honours

Club
Shakhtar Donetsk
Ukrainian Premier League (3) : 2009–10, 2010–11, 2011–12
Ukrainian Cup (2) :  2010–11, 2011–12
Ukrainian Super Cup (2) : 2008, 2010
UEFA Cup: 2008–09

References

External links
 Profile on Official Shakhtar website
 Ukrainian Premier League 2007–08 statistics
 
 

1986 births
Living people
Sportspeople from Poltava
Ukrainian footballers
Ukraine under-21 international footballers
Ukrainian Premier League players
Ukrainian Second League players
Ukrainian Amateur Football Championship players
Kazakhstan Premier League players
FC Shakhtar Donetsk players
FC Vorskla Poltava players
FC Vorskla-2 Poltava players
FC Sevastopol players
FC Mariupol players
FC Okzhetpes players
Ukrainian expatriate footballers
Expatriate footballers in Kazakhstan
Ukrainian expatriate sportspeople in Kazakhstan
Association football defenders